Huilong is a station on Line 5 and Line 6 of the Chengdu Metro in China. It was opened on 27 December 2019 and it is the southern terminus of Line 5.

References

Railway stations in Sichuan
Railway stations in China opened in 2019
Chengdu Metro stations